Songbook is a cover album released by Angela Aki on January 11, 2012.

The album contains covers of 12 popular English songs, mostly translated into Japanese, with some original English lyrics retained.

Track listing

Charts
Oricon Sales chart (Japan)

Release history

References

2012 albums
Angela Aki albums
Sony Music Entertainment Japan compilation albums